Spyridon Belokas (born 1877, date of death unknown) was a Greek athlete.  He competed at the 1896 Summer Olympics in Athens. He was born in Athens.

Belokas was one of 17 athletes to start the Olympic marathon race.  He crossed the finish line in third place behind Spiridon Louis and Charilaos Vasilakos, but was later found to have covered part of the course of the race by carriage rather than on foot.  Belokas was therefore disqualified, and Gyula Kellner was awarded third place.

References

External links

1877 births
Year of death missing
Greek male marathon runners
Greek male long-distance runners
Olympic athletes of Greece
Athletes (track and field) at the 1896 Summer Olympics
19th-century sportsmen
Athletes from Athens